Sanad Ali (Arabic:سند علي) (born 13 November 1988) is an Emirati footballer. He currently plays as a forward.

External links

References

Emirati footballers
1988 births
Living people
Al-Nasr SC (Dubai) players
Al Shabab Al Arabi Club Dubai players
Al-Ittihad Kalba SC players
Dibba FC players
Al Dhafra FC players
Emirati people of Baloch descent
Ajman Club players
Hatta Club players
Al-Taawon (UAE) Club players
La Liga academy HPC players
UAE First Division League players
UAE Pro League players
UAE Second Division League players
Association football forwards